"Oh My My" is a song by the Monkees, released on April 1, 1970 on Colgems single #5011. It was the final single released during their original 196670 run. The song was written by Jeff Barry and Andy Kim.  "Oh My My" was recorded February 5, 1970, and  made it to No. 98 on the Billboard Hot 100 chart.  The single was their last entry, on the charts, until 1986. The B-side was "I Love You Better", also written by Barry and Kim.

Background
By now, The Monkees were a duo consisting of Micky Dolenz and Davy Jones, and both sides of the single were sung by Dolenz. Both songs are from Changes, the Monkees' final studio album until 1987's Pool It! which was followed by Justus in 1996.

References 

1970 songs
1970 singles
The Monkees songs
Songs written by Jeff Barry
Songs written by Andy Kim